Sigma Alpha Epsilon Chapter House of Miami University is a registered historic building in Oxford, Ohio, listed in the National Register on 2005-02-08.  The building was modeled after Sulgrave Manor, ancestral home of George Washington.  The cornerstone was laid in November 1937 and the house was completed the following year.

Historic uses 
Educational Related Housing

See also 
Sigma Alpha Epsilon

Notes

External links
Ohio Historic Inventory Form with photos

Clubhouses on the National Register of Historic Places in Ohio
Fraternity and sorority houses
Buildings and structures of Miami University
University and college buildings on the National Register of Historic Places in Ohio
National Register of Historic Places in Butler County, Ohio
Sigma Alpha Epsilon